William Peyto (circa 1394 - 24 November 1464) Lord of Chesterton was an English knight from Warwickshire. He was the son of William de Peyto and Joan Thornbury.

He was the Sheriff of Warwickshire and Leicestershire between michaelmas 1428 till 10 February 1430 and again between 8 November 1436 and 7 November 1437. William was the garrison commander of the town and castle of Creil in France, that was besieged on 8 May 1441, by a French army led by King Charles VII of France. After two weeks the French artillery breached the walls. William Peyto, led the garrison and sallied out on 24 May but were beaten. They surrendered the next day and where allowed safe conduct into Normandy.

William was the captain of Dieppe and was captured during the siege of Dieppe in 1442/43. He was ransomed for 3,000 écus and had to mortgage his estates upon his return to England in 1445.

Marriage and issue
William married firstly Elizabeth, daughter of Robert Francisof Foremark, they had no issue.

He married secondly Katherine, the widow of Thomas Stafford of Baginton, she was the daughter of John Gresley and Elizabeth Clarell, they are known to have had the following issue:
John Peyto

Citations

References
 
Richardson, Douglas. Magna Carta Ancestry, 2nd Edition, Vol. III, p. 348–349.

External links
The History of Parliament: PEYTO, William (c.1394-1464), of Chesterton, Warws.

Year of birth unknown
1464 deaths
15th-century English people